Třemošná is a town in Plzeň-North District in the Plzeň Region of the Czech Republic. It has about 5,100 inhabitants.

Administrative parts
Village of Záluží is an administrative part of Třemošná.

Geography
It lies in the Plasy Uplands. The Třemošná Stream flows through the town.

History
The first written mention of Třemošná is from 1181. The village changed owners very often. Among the owners in the 13th–15th centuries were the chapter in Mělník, the monastery in Plasy, and various lower noblemen. In 1509, Třemošná was acquired by Albrecht of Kolowrat, later it was bought by Jan and Bernard Waldstein. In the late 17th century, Třemošná became part of the Nekmíř estate and shared its owners and destinies.

From the beginning of the 19th century, the village began to gradually change its face thanks to the development of coal mining and industry. In 1862–1864, a glass factory was established here. Coal mining ended at the end of the 19th century. In 1961, the village of Záluží was joined to Třemošná. In 1972, Třemošná became a town.

Demographics

Notable people
Václav Brožík (1851–1901), painter

References

External links

Cities and towns in the Czech Republic
Populated places in Plzeň-North District